Acria ornithorrhyncha is a moth in the family Depressariidae. It was described by Wang in 2008. It is found in China (Guangdong, Hongkong).

References

Moths described in 2008
Acria